Guerrero Chimalli ("Shield Warrior") is an outdoor steel sculpture by Enrique "Sebastián" Carbajal, installed along Bordo de Xochiaca Avenue, in Chimalhuacán, State of Mexico. It is a  artwork that depicts an indigenous warrior holding a Chīmalli (a type of shield) and a mace. The plinth serves as a museum and the sculpture as an observation deck. Excluding their plinths, it is slightly taller than the Statue of Liberty, in the United States.

History and description

It was created by Enrique "Sebastián" Carbajal. Due to its height and color, the sculpture can be seen throughout Chimalhuacán and in adjacent zones.

Its construction started during the 2009–2012 municipal administration. It is composed of 33 welded steel pieces painted with red polyurethane paint. Additionally, the government remodeled the median strip where it lies; they added a fountain, bridges and trees. These additional works cost $1.4 million ($ million in ).

The sculpture was inaugurated on 13 December 2014. It was dedicated to the Tenochcas that defended Tenochtitlan during the Fall of Tenochtitlan. The scultpure has an observation deck at its arm.

Sebastián described his work as "an exceptional, attractive and emotional colossus" whose purpose is "to promote the spirit, to understand what we are and to proceed as a society with a modern and universal mentality".

Reception
Like most of Sebastián's works, Guerrero Chimalli received mixed reactions to the artist's style. It additionally received criticism due to its cost as half of the municipality's population lives in some degree of poverty. According to Sebastián, the most expensive investment were the cranes that placed each piece. It was also compared to Mazinger Z, Ultraman, Godzilla and Transformers. Gil Gamés wrote for El Financiero: "You spot it from a distance and the warrior is ugly, but if you get closer it is simply hideous". Sebastián compared the criticism the sculpture received with similar opinions the Eiffel Tower experienced when it was inaugurated.

See also
 Coyote en Ayuno, another sculpture by Sebastián in the neighboring municipality of Nezahualcóyotl.
 List of tallest statues

References

External links
 
  at the State of Mexico's official tourism website (in Spanish)
 Guerrero Chimalli at Atlas Obscura

2014 establishments in Mexico
2014 sculptures
Aztec
Museums in the State of Mexico
Outdoor sculptures in the State of Mexico
Sculptures of men in Mexico
Steel sculptures in Mexico